Tommy Robredo was the defending champion, but he decided to compete in Houston instead.

Guillermo García López won the title, defeating Marcel Granollers in the final, 5–7, 6–4, 6–3.

Seeds
The top four seeds received a bye into the second round.

 Kevin Anderson (second round)
 Gaël Monfils (withdrew)
 Benoît Paire (quarterfinals)
 Marcel Granollers (final)
 João Sousa (second round)
 Federico Delbonis (semifinals)
 Robin Haase (first round)
 Guillermo García López (champion)

Draw

Finals

Top half

Bottom half

Qualifying

Seeds

 Gilles Simon (qualified)
 Dušan Lajović (second round)
 Stéphane Robert (second round)
 David Goffin (qualified)
 Paul-Henri Mathieu (first round, retired)
 Andrey Kuznetsov (qualifying competition, Lucky loser)
 Potito Starace (second round)
 Martin Fischer (qualifying competition)

Qualifiers

Lucky loser
  Andrey Kuznetsov

Qualifying draw

First qualifier

Second qualifier

Third qualifier

Fourth qualifier

References
 Main Draw
 Qualifying Draw

Grand Prix Hassan II - Singles
2014 Grand Prix Hassan II